The 2020 Coke Zero Sugar 400 was an NASCAR Cup Series race held on August 29, 2020 at Daytona International Speedway in Daytona Beach, Florida. Contested over 164 laps -- extended from 160 laps due to an overtime finish, on the  superspeedway, it was the 26th race of the 2020 NASCAR Cup Series season, and the final race of the regular season before the playoffs.

Report

Background

The race was held at Daytona International Speedway, a race track located in Daytona Beach, Florida, United States. Since opening in 1959, the track is the home of the Daytona 500, the most prestigious race in NASCAR. In addition to NASCAR, the track also hosts races of ARCA, AMA Superbike, USCC, SCCA, and Motocross. The track's  infield includes the  Lake Lloyd, which has hosted powerboat racing. The speedway is owned and operated by International Speedway Corporation.

The track was built in 1959 by NASCAR founder William "Bill" France, Sr. to host racing held at the former Daytona Beach Road Course. His banked design permitted higher speeds and gave fans a better view of the cars. Lights were installed around the track in 1998 and today, it is the third-largest single lit outdoor sports facility. The speedway has been renovated three times, with the infield renovated in 2004 and the track repaved twice — in 1978 and in 2010.

On January 22, 2013, the track unveiled artist depictions of a renovated speedway. On July 5 of that year, ground was broken for a project that would remove the backstretch seating and completely redevelop the frontstretch seating. The renovation to the speedway is being worked on by Rossetti Architects. The project, named "Daytona Rising", was completed in January 2016, and it cost US $400 million, placing emphasis on improving fan experience with five expanded and redesigned fan entrances (called "injectors") as well as wider and more comfortable seating with more restrooms and concession stands. After the renovations, the track's grandstands include 101,000 permanent seats with the ability to increase permanent seating to 125,000. The project was completed before the start of Speedweeks.

Entry list
 (R) denotes rookie driver.
 (i) denotes driver who are ineligible for series driver points.

Qualifying
Kevin Harvick was awarded the pole for the race as determined by competition-based formula.

Starting Lineup

Race

Stage Results

Stage One
Laps: 50

Stage Two
Laps: 50

Final Stage Results

Stage Three
Laps: 60

Race statistics
 Lead changes: 35 among 16 different drivers
 Cautions/Laps: 6 for 21
 Red flags: 2 for 15 minutes and 47 seconds
 Time of race: 2 hours, 39 minutes and 59 seconds
 Average speed:

Media

Television
NBC Sports covered the race on the television side. Rick Allen, 2000 Coke Zero 400 winner Jeff Burton, Steve Letarte and two-time Coke Zero 400 winner Dale Earnhardt Jr. covered the race from the booth at Charlotte Motor Speedway. Dave Burns, Parker Kligerman and Marty Snider handled the pit road duties on site, and Rutledge Wood handled the features from his home during the race.

Radio
MRN had the radio call for the race, which was also simulcast on Sirius XM NASCAR Radio.

Standings after the race

Drivers' Championship standings after Playoffs reset

Manufacturers' Championship standings

Note: Only the first 16 positions are included for the driver standings.

References

2020 Coke Zero Sugar 400
2020 NASCAR Cup Series
2020 in sports in Florida
August 2020 sports events in the United States